The 1920 George Washington Hatchetites Colonials football team was an American football team that represented George Washington University as a member of the South Atlantic Intercollegiate Athletic Association during the 1920 college football season. In their first season under head coach Bryan Morse, the team compiled a 1–6–1 record.

Schedule

References

George Washington
George Washington Colonials football seasons
George Washington Hatchetites football